Sebastopol is a city in Sonoma County, in California with a recorded population of 7,521, per the 2020 U.S. Census.

Sebastopol was once primarily a plum and apple-growing region. Today, wine grapes are the predominant agriculture crop, and nearly all lands once used for orchards are now vineyards. The creation of The Barlow, a $23.5 million strip mall on a floodplain at the edge of town, converting old agriculture warehouses into a trendy marketplace for fine dining, tasting rooms, and art, has made Sebastopol a popular Wine Country destination.

Famous horticulturist Luther Burbank had gardens in this region. The city hosts an annual Apple Blossom Festival in April and is home to the Sebastopol Documentary Film Festival.

History
The area's first known inhabitants were the native Coast Miwok and Pomo peoples. The town currently sits atop multiple village sites. The town of Sebastopol formed in the 1850s with a U.S. Post Office and as a small trade center for the farmers of the surrounding agricultural region. As California's population swelled after the westward migration and the California Gold Rush of 1848–1855, more and more settlers drifted into the fertile California valleys north of San Francisco to try their hand at farming.

There is some debate as to how the name "Sebastopol" came into use in Sonoma County. At one time, four other California towns were also named Sebastopol:

 one in Napa County, renamed Yountville
 one in Tulare County
 one in Sacramento County
 one in Nevada County

The town in Sonoma County originally had the name Pinegrove; the name change (according to rumor) had something to do with a bar fight in the late 1850s, which was compared by a bystander to the long British siege of the seaport of Sevastopol (1854–1855) during the Crimean War of 1853–1856. The original name survives in the name of the Pine Grove General Store downtown.

Sebastopol became known as the "Gravenstein Apple Capital of the World". The apple industry brought a steady rural prosperity to the town. In 1890 the San Francisco and North Pacific Railroad connected Sebastopol to the national rail network. The town was incorporated in 1902, with schools, churches, hotels, canneries, mills, wineries, and an opera house to its credit. The 1906 earthquake reduced most of these early buildings to rubble (Sebastopol is only seven miles from the city of Santa Rosa, the worst-hit town in the 1906 earthquake), but as elsewhere in the county, the town was rebuilt.

In the second half of the 20th century, the apple industry struggled to compete with other apple-producing regions and gradually declined in economic significance. With greater personal mobility and the rise of larger shopping centers in other Sonoma County communities, many residents now often commute to work and shop in the neighboring towns of Rohnert Park or Santa Rosa, while Sebastopol maintains its small-town charm. 

It is often incorrectly claimed that Sebastopol was the last town in Northern California to have working railroad trains on Main Street. The tracks were removed in the late 1980s. Passenger service had ceased in the 1930s, and regular freight service ended in the late 1970s. This was documented by Analy High School students in a 1979 video Our Train Down Main: a History of the Petaluma and Santa Rosa Railroad. The canneries and apple-processing plant are gone from downtown, and vineyards and housing developments have replaced many apple orchards, reducing the demand for freight service.

It is often also incorrectly stated that the tracks were removed in the 1990s when the downtown area was redesigned with two one-way streets to enhance traffic along Gravenstein Highway (Route 116). Main Street and Petaluma Avenue were actually designated one-way streets in 1985 in an attempt to deal with the town's perennial traffic problem.  the old train station houses the Western County Museum.

Geography

Sebastopol is situated on the edge of the Laguna de Santa Rosa, which is fed by Santa Rosa Creek and other tributaries, including three minor tributaries within the city limits – Zimpher Creek, Calder Creek and Witter Creek. The Laguna is a wetland area that is home to many species of wildlife and vegetation and divides the town from neighboring Santa Rosa. Nearly every winter the Laguna floods, cutting off State Route 12, and often flooding the low-lying businesses and homes on the eastern side of Sebastopol. The Pitkin Marsh lily and White sedge are two rare species of plants that are found in the vicinity of Sebastopol.

Demographics

2020
The 2020 United States Census reported that Sebastopol had a population of 7,521. The racial makeup of Sebastopol was 80.8% White (74.9% White, not Hispanic or Latino), 3.8% Asian, 1.7% African American, 0.2% Pacific Islander, 0.0% Native American and 7.0% from two or more races. Hispanic or Latino of any race were 12.7%.

2010
The 2010 United States Census reported that Sebastopol had a population of 7,379. The racial makeup of Sebastopol was 6,509 (88.2%) White, 72 (1.0%) African American, 60 (0.8%) Native American, 120 (1.6%) Asian, 19 (0.3%) Pacific Islander, 298 (4.0%) from other races, and 301 (4.1%) from two or more races. Hispanic or Latino of any race were 885 persons (12.0%).

The Census reported that 98.3% of the population lived in households and 1.7% were institutionalized.

There were 3,276 households, out of which 902 (27.5%) had children under the age of 18 living in them, 1,220 (37.2%) were opposite-sex married couples living together, 478 (14.6%) had a female householder with no husband present, 156 (4.8%) had a male householder with no wife present. There were 206 (6.3%) unmarried opposite-sex partnerships, and 52 (1.6%) same-sex married couples or partnerships. 1,132 households (34.6%) were made up of individuals, and 498 (15.2%) had someone living alone who was 65 years of age or older. The average household size was 2.21. There were 1,854 families (56.6% of all households); the average family size was 2.82.

The population was spread out, with 1,515 people (20.5%) under the age of 18, 471 people (6.4%) aged 18 to 24, 1,587 people (21.5%) aged 25 to 44, 2,525 people (34.2%) aged 45 to 64, and 1,281 people (17.4%) who were 65 years of age or older. The median age was 46.1 years. For every 100 females, there were 79.9 males. For every 100 females age 18 and over, there were 76.7 males.

The homeowner vacancy rate was 0.7%; the rental vacancy rate was 4.2%. 53.7% of the population lived in owner-occupied housing units and 44.5% lived in rental housing units.

The median income for a household in the city was $60,322 (+29.9% from 2000), and the median income for a family was $74,020 (+32.7% from 2000). The median per capita income for the city was $29,470 (+28.8% from 2000). For comparison, statewide California median per capita income in the 2010 Census was $27,885 (+22.8% from 2000).

2000
As of the census of 2000, there were 7,774 people, 3,250 households, and 1,953 families residing in the city. The population density was 4,139/sq mi (1,597/km). The racial makeup of the city was 89.85% White, 0.66% African American, 0.78% Native American, 1.52% Asian, 0.10% Pacific Islander, 3.86% from other races, and 3.23% from two or more races. Hispanic or Latino of any race were 9.26% of the population.

There were 3,250 households, out of which 31.8% included children under the age of 18 in the house, 41.5% were married couples living together, 14.2% were led by a female householder with no husband present, and 39.9% were other living arrangements. 31.8% of all households were made up of a single individual and 14.3% had someone living alone who was 65 years of age or older. The average household size was 2.33 and the average family size was 2.95.

For the most part the population is spread out across the age groups, although the young adult population is drastically lower than the other groups, indicating that most young people leave, at least temporarily. The reasons for this are probably a combination of the high cost of living and the lack of other young adults.
The percent distribution on the 2000 census by age was as follows: 23.6% under the age of 18, 7.4% from 18 to 24, 25.0% from 25 to 44, 27.6% from 45 to 64, and 16.5% who were 65 years of age or older. The median age was 42 years.

For every 100 females, there were 81.1 males. For every 100 females age 18 and over, there were 75.3 males.

The median income for a household in the city was $46,436, and the median income for a family was $55,792. Males had a median income of $40,538 versus $32,399 for females. The per capita income for the city was $22,881. About 4.7% of families and 6.9% of the population were below the poverty line, including 6.7% of those under age 18 and 6.0% of those age 65 or over.

Arts and culture

Places of interest in Sebastopol include:
 Sebastopol Center for the Arts
 Luther Burbank's Gold Ridge Experiment Farm
Guayaki Sustainable Rainforest Products world headquarters
 The historic Hogan Building: This was the Power House for the Petaluma and Santa Rosa Railroad, an electric railway. The first cars were run on the line in 1904, and the later named Hogan Building, built of stone from a local quarry, is one of the few in the area that made it through the 1906 earthquake.
 West County Museum, operated by the Western Sonoma County Historical Society in the former Petaluma and Santa Rosa Railroad passenger depot
 George A. Strout House
 Ives Park, summer home of the Sonoma County Repertory Theater
 Ragle Ranch Regional Park
 Joe Rodota Trail
 West County Trail
 Laguna de Santa Rosa
 Sebastopol Community Cultural Center
 The Barlow, an outdoor mall east of town, built on the floodplain of the Laguna de Santa Rosa

Government

Local
The city council consists of five members, each serving four-year terms. The city's laws are enforced by the Sebastopol Police Department.
City council races are not partisan, so each member does not officially represent any party, however since 2000 there has been a decent amount of attention given to the individual party membership of city council members in Sebastopol. This happened because in 2000, with the election of Craig Litwin and Sam Spooner to the city council, the town had a Green Party majority—or would have, if city council races were partisan. This was only the second time this had ever happened in California, the first being the town of Arcata, California in 1996.

Sebastopol tends to support environmental policies: Earlier, in 1986, the residents approved an initiative declaring Sebastopol a "Nuclear Free Zone", The town does not use pesticides in city landscaping, and several years back, when the police needed a new vehicle, the city council voted to purchase a hybrid instead of a standard police car.

Current issues facing the city include a high cost of living and ongoing difficulties with traffic (the town has two highways going through downtown).

The current city council members (as of December 2020) are:

 Una Glass, Mayor
 Sarah Glade Gurney, Vice Mayor
 Neysa Hinton
 Diana Rich
 Patrick Slayter

A former Mayor, Robert Jacob, who was selected by the city council in December 2013, was the owner of two medical marijuana dispensaries in Sonoma Count. He was reported to be the first American mayor to be involved in the industry.

State and federal

According to the California Secretary of State, as of February 10, 2019, Sebastopol has 5,285 registered voters. Of those, 3,346 (63.3%) are registered Democrats, 518 (9.8%) are registered Republicans, and 1,137 (21.5%) have declined to state a political party.

Law enforcement 
The Sebastopol Police Department serves the city. It currently employs 31 sworn and non sworn personnel, and 25 volunteers. The department was founded in the early 1900s. The divisions of the department are administration, watch commanders, patrol officers, dispatchers, reserve officers, community service volunteers and explorers. The population can grow up to 50,000 during special events, such as Apple Blossom Parade.

Education

Sebastopol Union operates two elementary schools: Parkside (K-4) and Brook Haven (5-8).

Sebastopol Charter, a K-8 public charter school, had the highest percentage (58%) of kindergarten students with medical exemptions to vaccines in California as of the summer of 2018.

Notable people

 Luther Burbank, horticulturist who established an  Gold Ridge Environmental Farm in the township in the late 19th century
 Les Claypool, bassist/vocalist of the band Primus
 Peter Coyote, narrator/author/actor
 Peter D'Amato, author
 Jerry Garcia and Mickey Hart of the Grateful Dead
 Nina Gerber, guitarist
 Schuyler Grant, actress of the 1985 adaptation of Anne of Green Gables
 Nick Gravenites, singer/songwriter
 Kitaro, Japanese New Age recording artist
 Peter Krause, actor
 J.Lately, rapper
 Luke Lamperti, racing cyclist
 Willard Libby, inventor of carbon dating, went to Analy High School
 Megan McDonald, an American children's literature author of more than 25 books including the Judy Moody & Stink Moody series
 Terence McKenna, ethnobotanist
 Matt Nix, showrunner for Burn Notice
 Johnny Otis, rhythm and blues pioneer
 Justin Raimondo, author
 Francine Rivers, novelist
 Mario Savio, freedom activist
 Dave Schools, bassist of the band Widespread Panic
 Charles M. Schulz, cartoonist and creator of Peanuts
 Smoov-E, rapper
 Mary Lou Spiess, polio survivor, disability rights advocate and pioneer of disabled fashion
 Rider Strong, actor
 Karen Valentine, actress of the television show Room 222
 Obie Scott Wade, screenwriter and creator of SheZow, went to Analy High School
 Tom Waits, singer/songwriter/musician
 Guy Wilson, actor
 Kate Wolf, singer/songwriter

Sister cities

 Chyhyryn, Ukraine
 Takeo, Japan

See also

Film locations in Sonoma County, California

References

Our Train Down Main : a History of the Petaluma & Santa Rosa Railroad. Sebastopol, CA: Analy High School, 1979. Videocassette (ca. 22 min.)

External links

West County Museum
Sebastopol Community Cultural Center
Sebastopol Arts Center
Sebastopol Business Directory and Information
Sebastopol Apple Blossom Festival
Sebastopol Documentary Film Festival

 
1902 establishments in California
Cities in Sonoma County, California
Cities in the San Francisco Bay Area
Incorporated cities and towns in California
Nuclear-free zones in the United States
Populated places established in 1902